Grupo Música Nova was a group formed by young composers and instrumentalists active in São Paulo in the early 1960s. The group was based on proposals to renew the musical language by incorporating principles of experimentation, graphics, and the adoption of theatrical and visual arts elements. O Manifesto Música Nova, text that led to the formation of Grupo Música Nova, was first written by Rogério Duprat in 1961 and published in 1963 by Revista Invenção n. 3. The document was signed by composers Rogério Duprat, Gilberto Mendes, Willy Corrêa de Oliveira, Damiano Cozzella, Julio Medaglia, Régis Duprat, Sandino Hohagen, and Alexandre Pascoal. This manifesto was strongly influenced by the Concrete Poetry Movement and by the proposals contained in the Plano Piloto para Poesia Concreta (written by Augusto de Campos, Décio Pignatari, and Haroldo de Campos and published in 1958). The text of the Manifesto Música Nova was also an aesthetic position that opposed nationalism, a musical current that at the time dominated the environment of Brazilian orchestras and music schools.

References
Stuni, Ricardo de Alcântara. A Script for Percussion by the Group Music Nova Composers: A Search for the New, Analyzed from the Notes 2015. 192 f. Dissertation (Mestrado) - Paulista State University Júlio de Mesquita Filho, Instituto de Artes, 2015. Disponível em: https://repositorio.unesp.br/bitstream/handle/11449/131847/000853765.pdf?

https://www.revistas.usp.br/criacaoecritica/article/view/189994/179453

sequence=1&isAllowed=y

Contemporary classical music ensembles
Brazilian classical musicians
1963 establishments in Brazil
Brazilian musical groups
Chamber music groups
Brazilian chamber groups